Jingxing Pass is one of the major mountain passes on the Taihang Mountains, site of the famous Battle of Tao River or Battle of Jingxing where the famous general Han Xin scored one of his many victories against superior forces.

The historical site from Han dynasty is in modern day Tumenguan Township referencing later named Tumen Pass. It is located near the tourist attraction Baodu Zhai. The Jingxing County, bearing the same name, is in the valley to the west of the passage.

Great Wall of China
Mountain passes of China
Landforms of Hebei